The Mailroom: Hollywood History from the Bottom Up is a book by David Rensin that accounts what it is like to work in the mailroom in Hollywood’s most prestigious talent agencies.  Rensin interviews over 200 graduates of mailrooms such as William Morris Agency and Creative Artists Agency in a never before told story of struggle, surprise, tears, glamour, and most importantly the real life behind the glitz.

From delivering food to catching leading actresses of the day in their negligee, this book gives an account of the unbelievable tasks that mailroom employees must go through in order to become part of the small percentages to make it to agent status.  The Mailroom is full of advice from Hollywood's leaders about how to fight your way through the masses and make it to the top of the most glamorous industry: Hollywood.

List of notable interviewees

Bernie Brillstein is the founding partner of Brillstein-Grey Entertainment, a preeminent management and production company.
Norman Brokaw is the current chairman of the William Morris Agency.  He started as the first West Coast trainee in 1943.  He has made the business both his career and life.  He has represented clients such as Marilyn Monroe, Kim Novak, Clint Eastwood, and, for over 35 years, Bill Cosby.
Rob Carlson is a senior vice president and head of the Motion Picture Literary and Directors Department at the William Morris Agency.
Barry Diller is currently chairman and CEO of the Universal entertainment group, with responsibility for Universal Studios, the film and TV operations, and theme parks.  He is also chairman and senior executive of InterActiveCorp. Diller has headed Paramount and Fox, invented TV’s “movie of the week.”
Hilly Elkins, film and stage producer and talent manager.
Brian Medavoy, co-founder of More/Medavoy Management. His former and current clients include Jimmy Fallon, Jason Bateman, Kristen Bell, Ryan Reynolds, and Bella Heathcote.
David Geffen is one of the entertainment industry’s most prolific leaders.  As an agent, manager, record mogul, art connoisseur, political contributor, film producer, and most notably the “G” in DreamWorks SKG.
Sam Haskell is the executive vice president, worldwide head of television, for the William Morris Agency.  He’s been with the company for over twenty five years. 
Judy Hofflund formed InterTalent Agency, part of which later merged with United Talent Agency, where she ran the Talent Department.  She is now one of the two owners of ‘’’Hofflund/Polone’’’, a management and production company representing clients such as Kevin Kline, Kenneth Branagh, Sally Field, Julia Louis-Dreyfus, and Alan Rickman.
Kevin Huvane is a managing director of Creative Artists Agency.
Ronald Meyer is one of the agents who left William Morris Agency to form Creative Artists Agency.  After leaving CAA, Meyer joined Universal and is currently chairman of Universal Pictures.
Rowland Perkins co-founded the Creative Artists Agency with four others who left William Morris Agency in 1975.  After leaving CAA in 1995 he became an independent producer of feature, TV, network, and cable films.  Currently Mr. Perkins is chairman and also sits on the board of ieProducer.com, an integrated Internet company, and is president of ieProducer.com’s wholly owned subsidiary ‘’’Talentclick’’’, an Internet company servicing the casting needs of the motion picture, television, legitimate theater, and commercial worlds.
Jack Rapke is a partner in ImageMovers, a film and TV production company affiliated with DreamWorks SKG.  His productions include Cast Away and What Lies Beneath. 
Stan Rosenfield is the owner and president of Stan Rosenfield and Associates, the entertainment industry’s leading public relations company.
Tom Strickler is a founding partner at The Endeavor Agency.
Jeremy Zimmer is a partner and board member at United Talent Agency.

Reception
The book was reviewed in many newspapers, including the  Los Angeles Times by David Freeman, in USA Today, UPI, the Washington Post and   Entertainment Weekly

References

External links 
Tell Me Everything
NPR Interview with Rensin about the book March 7, 2003

Works about the history of Hollywood, Los Angeles
2003 non-fiction books
Books about film
Ballantine Books books